Jerry Nicholas Dior (May 14, 1932 – May 10, 2015) was an American graphic designer, best known for creating the Major League Baseball logo.

Early life
Dior was born in Brooklyn, New York and attended Abraham Lincoln High School. He then earned a scholarship to the Art Students League of New York and later graduated from the Pratt Institute. Dior served in the army during the Korean War, and was stationed in the U.S.

Major League Baseball logo
Comic illustrator James Sherman formerly claimed to have designed the Major League Baseball logo, but retracted his claims in November 2008, a few weeks after the Wall Street Journal interviewed Dior. According to Dior, the logo design cost between $10,000 and $25,000, and was finished in one afternoon. He maintained that the logo, introduced in 1969, was not inspired by Harmon Killebrew, but rather "pure design" with reference to several photographs.

Former colleague Alan Siegel, the designer of the National Basketball Association logo, based his work on Dior's design and a photograph of Jerry West.

Other work
Dior also helped design packaging for Kellogg's and Nabisco while at Sandgren & Murtha. He left the marketing company shortly after his work on the Major League Baseball logo and became a freelance designer. Dior died of colon cancer at his home in Edison, New Jersey on May 10, 2015.

References

1932 births
2015 deaths
American graphic designers
People from Brooklyn
Deaths from cancer in New Jersey
United States Army personnel of the Korean War
United States Army soldiers
Art Students League of New York alumni
Abraham Lincoln High School (Brooklyn) alumni
People from Edison, New Jersey
Deaths from colorectal cancer
Pratt Institute alumni
Logo designers